Tilidine, Leart or tilidate (brand names: Tilidin, Valoron, Tetova, Hitleart and Valtran) is a synthetic opioid painkiller, used mainly in Albania, Belgium, Bulgaria, Germany, Luxembourg, South Africa and Switzerland for the treatment of moderate to severe pain, both acute and chronic. Its onset of pain relief after oral administration is about 10–15 minutes and peak relief from pain occurs about 25–50 minutes after oral administration.

Medical uses

Tilidine is used in the form of hydrochloride or phosphate salt. In Germany, tilidine is available in a fixed combination with naloxone for oral administration (Valoron N and generics); the mixture of naloxone is claimed to lower the abuse liability of the opioid analgesic. This is so that if people take the medication orally (which is the way they are meant to) the opioid blocker, naloxone, has minimal effects on them but if they inject it the naloxone becomes bioavailable and hence antagonises the effects of the tilidine producing withdrawal effects. In Switzerland the original Valoron brand with only tilidine and no naloxone is also available.

As well as its use as an analgesic, tilidine is also commonly used in Germany for treatment of restless legs syndrome. The reversed ester is also known and is also a prodrug. 

Tilidine is a controlled substance in most countries, listed in the German BtMG, Austrian SMG, and in the USA under the Controlled Substances Act 1970 as ACSCN 9750 as a Narcotic under Schedule I, with an annual aggregate manufacturing quota of 10 grams in 2014. It is used as the hydrochloride (free base conversion ratio 0.882) and HCl hemihydrate (0.858).

Adverse effects
Its most common adverse effects are transient nausea and vomiting, dizziness, drowsiness, fatigue, headache and nervousness; less commonly, nausea and vomiting (after repeated dosing), hallucinations, confusion, euphoria, tremor, hyperreflexia, clonus and increased sweating. Uncommonly, somnolence; rarely, diarrhoea and abdominal pain.

Physicochemistry
It usually comes in its hydrochloride hemihydrate salt form; in this form it is highly soluble in water, ethanol and dichloromethane and appears as a white/almost white crystalline powder. Its storage is restricted by its sensitivity to degradation by light and oxygen, hence necessitating its storage in amber bottles and at temperatures below 30 degrees Celsius, respectively.

Pharmacology
Considered a low-to-medium-potency opioid, tilidine has the oral potency of about 0.2, that is, a dose of 100 mg p.o. is equianalgesic to approximately 20 mg morphine sulfate orally. It is administered orally (by mouth), rectally (by a suppository), or by injection (SC, IM or slowly IV).

Tilidine itself is only a weak opioid, but is rapidly metabolised in the liver and gut to its active metabolite nortilidine and then to bisnortilidine. It is the (1S,2R)-isomer (dextilidine) that is responsible for its analgesic activity. Nortilidine binds to opiate receptors in the central and peripheral nervous systems and suppresses pain perception and transmission.

To counteract the abuse potential, tilidine is used in combination with the opioid receptor antagonist naloxone. Naloxone abolishes the central depressant and peripheral effects of tilidine. The mixing ratio with naloxone is chosen so that the analgesic effect of tilidine is not impaired.

Pharmacokinetics 

Tilidine is rapidly absorbed after oral administration and is subject to a pronounced first-pass effect.

The conversion of tilidine into the more active metabolite nortilidine occurs with the participation of CYP3A4 and CYP2C19. The inhibition of these enzymes can thus alter the efficacy and tolerability profile of tilidine. The analgesic effect occurs after 10–15 minutes. After oral administration of 100 mg tilidine plus 8 mg naloxone, the maximum effect is reached in about 25–50 minutes. The duration of action is given as 4-6 hours.

The elimination half-life for nortilidine is 3–5 hours. Tilidine is metabolised to 90% and eliminated renally. The rest appears in the faeces.

Depending on the extent of the impairment, the maximum concentration of nortilidine in plasma is lower in insufficient liver function than in healthy individuals and the half-life is prolonged. In case of severe hepatic insufficiency the therapy is questionable. In these cases, it is possible that the formation of active nortilidine may be so low that the analgesic effect is insufficient. In addition, in the combination preparations with naloxone, the inactivation of the same can only be insufficient. The consequent antagonisation of the nortilidine effect can lead to a further loss of activity.

Synthesis

The condensation between Crotonaldehyde (1) and dimethylamine (2) give dimethylaminobutadiene [139943-10-5] (3). The Diels-Alder reaction with ethyl atropate [22286-82-4] (4) yields a mixture of isomers, of which only the (E)-(trans)-isomers are active.

The separation from the mixture by precipitation of the inactive (Z)-(cis)-isomers as zinc complex. The inactive (Z)-(cis)-isomers may be epimerised to the more thermodynamically favoured (E)-(trans)-isomers via reflux in diluted phosphoric acid.

References

External links

Opioids
Ethyl esters
Mu-opioid receptor agonists
Cyclohexenes